Four ships of the United States Navy have been named USS Missouri in honor of the state of Missouri:
, a sidewheel frigate launched in 1841 and destroyed by fire in August 1843
, a Maine-class battleship in service from 1900 to 1922.
, an Iowa-class battleship in service (variably) from 1944 to 1992; site of the official Japanese surrender of World War II; now a floating war memorial at Naval Base Pearl Harbor, Hawaii
, a Virginia-class submarine commissioned in 2010

See also 
, a Confederate States Navy river gunboat based primarily on the Red River during the American Civil War.
, several merchant ships with this name

United States Navy ship names